Moguds Pellams is a 2005 Indian Telugu language film directed by actor Ranganath who made his directorial debut and was his only directorial. The film stars Sivaji Raja and Rathi.

Summary

Two strangers meet each other while traveling from their native place to find a job in the city. To find an accommodation, they pretend to be a married couple. With time, they are attracted to each other, but are hesitant to admit it but finally unites.

Cast
 Sivaji Raja as Srinivas 
 Rathi as Padmavathi 
 Karthik
 Harika
 Chandra Mohan
 M. S. Narayana
 Annapoorna
 L. B. Sriram
 Raghu Babu
 Sana
 Satyam Rajesh
 Duvvasi Mohan

Awards
Nitya Santoshini won Nandi Award for Best Female Playback Singer for the song "Ninne Daachanu"

References

External links 
 

2000s Telugu-language films
2005 directorial debut films
2005 films
2005 romantic comedy films
Indian romantic comedy films